Peter Evans (28 December 1926 – 19 July 2014 in Frinton-on-Sea) was a restaurateur. He was described by journalist Linda Blandford, writing in The Observer, 9 March 1975 as a "harbinger who heralded the youth culture with one of Soho's first coffee bars, The Cat's Whisker, where Tommy Steele strummed... Evans also foresaw the coming of increasing spending on dining out with his chain of Aberdeen Angus Steak Houses." and the David Nightingale Hicks - decorated Peter Evans Eating Houses. 

Evans started the Cat's Whisker coffee bar with Spanish dancing but this soon gave way to skiffle and rock 'n roll; because of lack of dancing space, the bar invented hand-jiving .

Later, Evans teamed up with two other young creatives: David Hicks and architect Patrick Garnett  of Garnett, Cloughley and Blakemore. According to Malcolm Newell in his book Mood and Atmosphere in Restaurants they set the decorative style that epitomised London in the Swinging Sixties, giving the affluent vibrant places to dine and dance. The times saw an explosion in fashions –  male and female: Twiggy, Biba, Mary Quant, Teddy Boys, Cecil Gee, John Stephen, Carnaby Street. Evans was voted 'Beau Brummell' Best Dressed Man in 1965 by the Clothing  Manufacturers' Federation. 

In 1967 Evans started the exclusive, members-only, Raffles night-club in the King's Road, Chelsea. Hicks's design lasted through to 2007 when new owners gave it a 'complete makeover' . The club was popular throughout the Sixties with the royals of the day. Princess Margaret,  Princess Anne and Prince Charles were all visitors. The younger royals have followed: Prince William when romancing Kate Middleton and Prince Harry when pursuing Chelsy Davy.

Inter alia, Hicks designed sets for Richard Lester's 1968 movie Petulia, starring Julie Christie.  Garnett's Chelsea Drugstore was immortalised in Stanley Kubrick's 1971 film A Clockwork Orange.

Early life
Born in Highgate, London, his father, Lionel Oliver Evans, was an inventor and builder.

Educated briefly at Belmont, Mill Hill, Evans then worked with his father until one row too far drove him to Ghana, West Africa. There, to spice up a boring life selling insurance, he wrote for the Daily Mirror'''s West African subsidiary, the Daily Graphic, becoming their African and Wimbledon tennis correspondent.

Eventually, his insurance employers realised he was spending more time on tennis than selling their product and he was fired. Returning to London, Evans and a self-confessed Casablancan cigarette smuggler, Roy Wallace-Dunlop partnered to open one of the first coffee bars, The Cat's Whisker, with Spanish dancing and expressos as the drawcards. That partnership failing, Evans took on a young live-wire, Robin Eldridge (pictured); Eldridge suggested dropping the Spanish dancing for something 'fresher'. A jukebox appeared, soon to be followed by live music. This attracted a flood of youngsters into Soho to listen to Lonnie Donegan and his skiffle and Tommy Steele's jumpin' rock 'n roll. With no space for dancing, The Cat's Whisker gave birth to the hand-jive which took off, enthusiastically supported, among many others, by film-maker Ken Russell, who was a Cat's Whisker customer making a name for himself as a freelance photographer at the time.

Restaurateur

After The Cat's Whisker was closed down by the police because of over-crowding, Evans was introduced to accountant Tom Beale and butcher Reg Eastwood and the trio became partners to create the first of the Angus Steak Houses at 1 Kingly Street, Soho, the site of the recently closed Cat's Whisker.

The chain of steak houses grew but the partnership with Beale and Eastwood did not long survive before Evans split and started the Peter Evans Eating Houses, with establishments in, e.g. Fleet Street (with a teleprinter), Chelsea, and Kensington. Evans turned to David Hicks, the most brilliant of the young designers (others being Terence Conran, Dennis Lennon and Michael Inchbald also making a name for themselves in the 'relatively new field of restaurant design,' according to Mood and Atmosphere in Restaurants) and architects Garnett, Cloughley and Blakemore, to design the PEEH restaurants and in 1967 Hicks designed the most enduring of Evans's creations, Raffles,  one of the tiny number of traditional and high-flyer clubs surviving from the Sixties to this day.

Evans-Hicks-Garnett were among the 'potent movers and shakers of the 1960s'. Architects GCB designs included some of the most iconic buildings of the time, e.g. from the revolving restaurant at the top of the Post Office Tower (then the tallest building in London), fashion boutiques on the King's Road, Chelsea, including the Chelsea Drug Store, commemorated by the Rolling Stones in You Can't Always Get What You Want, and later used as a set for Stanley Kubrick's film A Clockwork Orange (1971), to the George V Hotel in Paris. In addition to his stylish designs for the PEEH restaurants, Hicks's creation of the snappy fork logo  , was later to give the restaurants worldwide publicity.

In 1964 Evans collaborated with illustrator Willie Rushton on The Anti-Bull Cook-Book, the hardback being published by Anthony Blond; the paperback was called The Stag Cook Book: A low guide to the high art of nosh and was published by The New English Library – Four Square in February 1967.

Back to the pen
Various pressures, not least his divorce in October 1965 (until 1971 divorces were only granted "because of bad behaviour") led Evans to sell his holdings to his banker, Norman Lonsdale, in 1969, and, after an extensive tour abroad, he landed in Australia. In Brisbane he met and married his second wife, the journalist Gail Wintour; their best man was Hugh Lunn, the well-known journalist and author. In Brisbane Evans wrote the magic-comedy television series, the Martin St James Show, for The Reg Grundy Organisation on the 10 Network. For the Australian Broadcasting Corporation, he wrote and presented a 13-part radio programme, "Earthquake", on the best of modern music.

Moving to Sydney Evans became a regular contributor to Scope, a weekly radio programme on "the unusual, the topical, the entertaining" (which ran for 18 years on the ABC); and freelanced for News Corp's The Australian and Kerry Packer's The Bulletin.

Working for other people not much to his liking, Evans returned to the UK, founded a merchant bank (Montgomery Evans) and attempted to buy back the Peter Evans' Eating Houses and the night club Raffles. However, Norman Lonsdale had just sold the group to G&W Walker, the commercial vehicle for the boxing brothers, Billy and George Walker. The Financial Times headline said it all: "Walker Brothers KO Peter Evans' Bid".

Soon tiring of merchant banking, Evans returned to writing when his idea for a book was commissioned by New English Library. Increasingly worried by population growth and the West's indifference to the world's hungry, he wrote a harbinger's novel, Megadeath. "Many, many millions are already starving; most of these will die because of feeding animals (for every 10 kilograms of soya protein fed to cattle only one kilogram is converted to meat), with food that should be used to feed people." He also foretold that methane production by the planet's billion meat animals would prove a tipping point for climate change.

After doing consulting work for a children's charity, Evans attempted to breathe life back into the Peter Evans Eating House concept by up-dating it, but failed – he was too early with the 'fusion' food concept, and a further chain venture, The Vertical Refreshment Company, which offered in-house games and cut-price drinks in exciting pub environments looked promising but eventually lost out because of increasing resistance from the brewers. "Brewers are greedy b******s, I'm afraid," Evans observed.

Publisher-writer
A life in the country beckoned and in rural Pembrokeshire, the couple wrote Guide To Village Riches, a how-to book showing the way to cope and earn following the transition from city to country living. Evans has a family background in medicine and this interest led him and his wife also to write a series of books (now e-books) setting out drug-free treatments for common but hard-to-eradicate ailments.

An insomniac following the divorce from his first wife, ("Men suffer more in a divorce than women") Evans invented an original way to get his sleep back. Writing under the pen name Zachariah Evans, he had worldwide success with a revolutionary, sufferer-controlled cure entitled Sleeplessness Cured: The Drug-free, Quick and Proven Way.This was awarded 'Best Social Invention' by the London Institute for Social Inventions, 1993. In 1994 another of the couple's health books Cigarette Addiction Permanently Cured was also awarded an Honourable Mention by the same Institute.

They have also published the results of some long-term research into the validity of star signs.

Disappointed by today's politicians, they are currently working on a viable version of government that will begin to seriously address and solve the planet's urgent challenges, and at the same time put in place a theft-proof way to keep sticky political fingers from tax-payers money. Evans holds the opinion that permanently closing 'the best club in London', the redundant and massively expensive-to-run Houses of Parliament, would make a good starting point for a significant and down-to-earth money-saving campaign.
"With the availability of video-conferencing there's no longer a need for Parliament as such. The people's representatives should live and work in their constituencies, not be swanning around wasting our money."

The not-so-private life Thumbnails
The Cat's Whisker at one time was so busy that, at the height of its popularity, according to Coca-Cola, it was that company's biggest single customer in the UK.
It was closed down by the police in 1958 because of ' dangerous over-crowding'. 
Within a few weeks Evans had converted the Soho coffee bar into the first Angus Steak House selling "Supremely Succulent Scotch Steaks" at "Prices That Won't Spoil Your Appetite". 
There were three founders and for a time they used to drink together. However, one evening a beer-chucking incident marked the beginning of the end of the association.

Evans' prickly nature later also led to a falling out with his bankers, Kleinwort Benson Lonsdale. Evans discovered that Kleinwort's board representative was after Evans's job as chairman of PEEH. To the bank's horror, Evans fired him.]

Evans' private life was extravagant; Bentley motor cars, Turnbull & Asser shirts, Lobb shoes , and Savile Row suits were not the only indulgences; (perhaps the self-regard was an investment not entirely wasted: he was elected 'Best Dressed Man' in July 1965); high-stakes gambling and a number of ladies, including the diva, Barbara Leigh, featured, all ultimately leading to long-suffering wife Yolanda's suit for divorce.
At the divorce court hearing, Evans's QC, Billy Rees-Davis, revealed the evidence of the family chauffeur that Mrs Evans and her mother had disguised themselves in skin stains and Indian saris and shadowed Evans around London to collect evidence of Evans's adultery. Evans recorded his surprise at these dramatics; evidence was not that difficult to get...

He kept potentially expensive company round the card table. His opponents included John Bingham (later Lord Lucan), before his fall the most formidable stud poker player in London. Evans is frequently asked whether or not he believes that Lucan murdered Sandra Rivett in November 1974. "John was a killer at the poker table, a pussycat away from it. Certainly not!"  And is Lucan still alive? "His family is long-lived. John is probably still with us, possibly living right here in the UK!" In Evans's opinion, Lucan should now come forward "to face the music" and prove his innocence.

Another player was Roger Moore ("Ah, Mr Bond"). Alas, in real life the handsome actor never quite measured up to the poker mastery displayed by Ian Fleming's steely-eyed creation.

Amongst several other regular poker fiends  Evans took on were journalists David Spanier and Peter Jenkins, painter David Hockney, writer Alan Williams, and impresario Michael White.
These high-stakes players were dangerous but beatable if nerves held and fortune favoured. However, Evans also used to play at John Aspinall's Clermont Club where chance was apparently less likely to favour the punter, at least so it was as alleged years later with the publication of Douglas Thompson's book, "The Hustler's" (pub Sidgwick & Jackson 2007) and Channel 4's "The Real Casino Royale".

Evans fell out with Aspinall because of the alleged Clermont cheating but ultimately forgave the dying man because of his passion for animals. "They will not destroy the planet; humans may."

Besides the nightclub, new restaurants, dalliance and gambling, Evans had other outlets for his money. At one time, with David Frost, his host at the much-publicised Connaught Hotel breakfast of 7 January 1966, and film director Bryan Forbes, the trio found themselves temporarily 'owning' Private Eye whilst it overcame a little local difficulty with its cash flow.

One somewhat larger challenge Evans and Frost survived was perhaps more by luck than judgement: a high-profile mutual acquaintance had asked to be involved in the multimillion-pound redevelopment of a property in a prime Kings Road position owned by Evans. At a critical stage the third party pulled out and it was only afterwards Frost and Evans discovered that he had fallen victim to one of his frequent financial crises. The acquaintance was Robert Maxwell.

Evans then was approached by the phenomenally successful Italian trattoria maestro, Alvaro Maccioni, who appealed to Evans to sell him the site. Evans agreed, but even Alvaro's magic stuttered there.

Evans was seldom far from the headlines; one of the more bizarre (London Evening Standard, 1965) read "Eating Houses Boss Arrested at Board Meeting," and concerned the absurdity of  Evans being summarily arrested in the middle of a board meeting, handcuffed and marched off to Savile Row police station. The crime? Failure to pay some parking tickets.

Certainly a row at the time, but one that Evans later realised played a part in leading to his second marriage, this connected him with another bizarrerie. In all innocence he erected his usual Peter Evans Eating Houses sign over a new restaurant at the junction of Kensington High Street and Kensington Church Street . The Eating House was bang next door to a church and the David Hicks's stylised PEEH fork was pointing directly at it. The Church elders were not amused. 'Definitely not Good Evans – His Devil's Fork Threatens The Church' summed up newspaper headlines around the world.

However, Gail, the object of Evans's affections in Australia, had read about the hoo-ha and found it amusing.

References

Bibliography
 Sandbrook, Dominic  Never Had It So Good: 1956–63 v1 A History of Britain from Suez to the Beatles Abacus .  5 May 2005
 Sandbrook, Dominic White Heat: A History of Britain in the Swinging Sixties Abacus .  3 August 2006
 Newell, Malcolm Mood and Atmosphere in Restaurants 1965 Barrie and Rockliff (Barrie Books Ltd), London WC2
 Evans, Peter The Anti-Bull Cook-Book With drawings by William Rushton pub Anthony Blond 1964 (pre-ISBN)
 Evans, Peter The Stag Cook Book' A low guide to the high art of nosh With drawings by William Rushton pub New English Library A Four Square Book 1967
 Evans, Peter Megadeath pub New English Library 1976
 Barr, Ann and York, Peter The Official Sloane Ranger Handbook Ebury Press 1982 
 Lewis, Julie Editor of Unlimited Scope Hargreen Publishing Company 1983 
 Thompson, Douglas The Hustlers  Pan Books 2008 
 Evans, Peter (Zachariah) and G Theresa Wintour. Guide to Village Riches''. Saturday Richmond, 1990. 

Georgie sydney 14:14, 19 April 2010 (UTC)
Georgie sydney 14:57, 20 April 2010 (UTC)
Georgie sydney 18:35, 22 April 2010 (UTC)
Georgie sydney 11:19, 29 April 2010 (UTC)

1926 births
2014 deaths
Businesspeople from London
British restaurateurs
People from Highgate
20th-century English businesspeople